Twitchell Island is an island in the Sacramento-San Joaquin River Delta in Sacramento County, California,  southwest of Sacramento. The island is entirely within the Rio Vista Gas Field, although well pads and associated infrastructure make up only a small part of its land use. It is managed by Reclamation District 1601.

Twitchell is eighty-five percent owned by the State of California.

Twitchell Island is the site of an experiment being conducted by the U.S. Geological Survey to study whether growing tules and cattails on the sinking islands of the Sacramento Delta can reverse the soil loss caused by wind, rain and farming.  The soil under the  site has risen  since the project started in 1996.

The plants not only help rebuild the level of the soil, but sequester quite a bit of carbon as well.  It is believed that farmers in the delta might be able to make money with so-called "carbon-capture" farming by planting tules and cattails rather than row crops and get paid by companies who need to meet state greenhouse gas limits.

See also
List of islands of California

References

Bibliography

External links
 

Islands of the Sacramento–San Joaquin River Delta
Islands of Northern California
Islands of Sacramento County, California